Mountain Valley Conference may refer to :

 Mountain Valley Conference (Maine), an athletic conference for small high schools
 Mountain Valley Conference (New Jersey), a former high school sports association under the jurisdiction of the New Jersey State Interscholastic Athletic Association
 Mountain Valley Conference (Pennsylvania), a former athletic conference of high schools and school districts
 Mountain Valley Conference (NJCAA), collegiate conference based in New York